RFA Fort Rosalie (A186) was an armament stores carrier of the Royal Fleet Auxiliary.

She was built by United Shipyards, Montreal and initially completed as a stores ship but converted to an armament stores issuing ship at Portsmouth 1947/8. She served in the Pacific Fleet Train and remained in the Far East until 1951. She took part in Operation Grapple, the thermonuclear weapon test at Christmas Island in 1957. The ship was fitted with cargo lifts 1959/60. She was decommissioned on 1 May 1972 and laid up at Rosyth. She arrived at Castellon for scrapping on 10 February 1973.
 During World War II, 28 were lost to enemy action, and four were lost due to accidents. Many of the surviving 166 ships passed to the United States Maritime Commission. The last recorded scrapping was in 1985.
Fort and Park ship were the Canadian equivalent of the American Liberty ships. All three shared a similar design by J.L. Thompson and Sons of Sunderland, England. Fort ships had a triple expansion steam engine and a single screw propeller.

See also
RFA Fort Langley (A230)
RFA Fort Charlotte (A236)
RFA Fort Duquesne (A229)
Fort Cataraqui (ship)

External links
RFA Website
Navynews.co.uk entry

References

Stores ships of the Royal Fleet Auxiliary
1944 ships